Moby Doll was the first orca (killer whale) to survive in captivity for more than two days, and the second to be displayed in a public aquarium exhibit. The availability, for the first time, of a killer whale that could be studied at close quarters alive initiated pioneering research. From a recording of Moby Doll's calls, he was years later identified as a member of J Pod of the Southern Residents, the population of orcas most damaged by subsequent captures.

At the time of his capture, the species was widely feared and hated. In 1972, Washington State Game Department supervisor Garry Garrison declared that orcas "had until recently been the subject of fear and violence. 'They were harassed, shot at, and killed at every opportunity. Don White, once an orca researcher at the Vancouver Aquarium, later a critic of orca captivity, wrote in 1975, "Before the capture of Moby Doll, of Namu and of Skana killer whales as a species were regarded by fishermen as vermin. Happily, this is no longer the case."

Moby Doll was kept alive in captivity by the Vancouver Aquarium after being harpooned and not dying as had been planned. "His unplanned capture proved the viability of holding a killer whale in captivity, and it hinted at the potential of live orcas as tourist attractions. It also revealed the emotional attachment the species could generate." A major difficulty in his captivity was that, for a long time, aquarium staff could not successfully feed him.

History

Capture
The 15 foot (4.6m) long male killer whale was captured in 1964 near East Point, Saturna Island in British Columbia. His size indicated he was most likely 5 years old - a young child. A sculptor, Samuel Burich, had been commissioned by the Vancouver Public Aquarium to kill "a specimen as a basis for the preparation of a replica for the Aquarium's new British Columbia hall." Its staff were convinced it would be impossible to handle a live one safely after the difficulties experienced by Marineland of the Pacific with their capture of Wanda and subsequent capture attempts.

The collectors mounted a harpoon gun at East Point, Saturna Island on May 20, 1964, as data compiled at the Light House from 1958 to 1963 showed that killer whales were particularly common there from May to October (peaking in August with large groups). After several sightings in late May, the collectors had only two more before the day when they harpooned an orca, which was July 16. The small whale, a youngster, was swimming about 20 meters from the rocks. The large harpoon struck the whale just behind the head, fatefully just missing the cervical cord and the brain on either side of the spot. The whale appeared stunned but unexpectedly did not die. To the surprise of Burich and his assistant Josef Bauer, other orcas, rather than fleeing, were raising their injured podmate to the surface to breathe.

After the pod moved away, the whale tried for hours to expel the harpoon and pull away from the heavy line. Bauer had been moved by the actions of the other orcas and the juvenile whale's cries, and rowed out in a skiff to shield him from further attempts to shoot him with rifles. No wounds from bullets were later found.

The Vancouver Aquarium's founder director, Murray Newman, decided to keep the wounded whale alive and bring him to Vancouver, although the local SPCA and others protested passionately. With care, the captors managed to have the young orca trail their small fishing boat like a dog on a leash; he intelligently avoided pain by not dragging on the harpoon rope. "They puttered slowly through the night, sometimes catching glimpses of another orca who seemed to be following." Because the aquarium did not have a suitable pool for this unplanned and novel captive, he was given improvised accommodation at Burrard Dry Dock. When he arrived, the aquarium's assistant curator Vince Penfold and neuroscientist Pat McGeer removed the harpoon and administered first aid.

To vacate the dock and allow it to return to its regular work, a makeshift seapen for the killer whale was constructed on army property at Jericho Beach, a location with less vessel traffic. The pen was "cut into a decrepit and abandoned jetty."

The seven-mile transfer of Moby Doll's berth on July 24 took ten hours, longer than expected, due in part to his resistance and attempts to escape. "The captured killer whale bucked, twisted, squealed angrily, thrashed the water and charged the boat that tried to nudge her into her new home," reported the Vancouver Sun. Sam Burich and Vince Penfold were in the boat.

Display
On Saturday, July 18, Burrard Dry Dock had been opened for the general public to watch the killer whale. About 10,000 visitors queued in the rain to see him. Subsequently, the public was kept away, however. Because scientists had never previously been able to study a live killer whale, aquarium curator Murray Newman was eager to keep Moby Doll for that purpose, more than for display. He thought that scientific study of the whale was best undertaken away from the chaos created when the public was in attendance. The whale's poor health and well-being led the aquarium to put off any further public viewing of the captive. When Moby Doll was moved to the army base at Jericho, "guards were posted 24 hours a day to protect the whale from the public." However, to Newman's dismay, the Jericho army base proved to be insecure, and sightseers flocked to it without authorisation. Moby Doll did not interact with humans to the extent that later captive killer whales did. When visitors came, he would withdraw to the opposite end of the seapen.

Following Moby Doll's move to Jericho, Sam Burich was appointed his full-time guardian. He used to play music to him to try to alleviate the whale's loneliness. On some occasions, the killer whale seemed to duet with him as Burich played a police whistle.

Jericho seapen
The pen measured about 14 by 23 m. with a water depth from 3 to 7.5 m. varying with the tide. "The whale's habitual circuit of its pen was counterclockwise at speeds of 2 to 4 knots, the loop usually taking 35 seconds. It often blew (respired) once a circuit, but sometimes made two or three circuits on one breath. The routine seemed to be interrupted only at times of calling." "The large size of the animal retarded maneuverability within the pen."

Scientific importance

Moby Doll enabled scientists to study, for the first time, the sound production of killer whales, which is foremost in importance for their lifestyle. Woods Hole Oceanographic Institution scientists William E. Schevill and William A. Watkins, pioneers in researching whale sounds, traveled to Vancouver to study Moby Doll for two days. The orca gave them proof that killer whales used animal echolocation, and also showed that they did not need it when memory or daylight were sufficient. He also gave them evidence that killer whale echolocation was directionally focused, hypothetically by the melon.

Their study of Moby Doll's calls was also a scientific first. These were not the "whistle-like squeals" that could be produced simultaneously with echolocation by the other delphinids that had been studied. The killer whale's calls were pulses of clicks at a very fast repetition-rate, with strong harmonics. (In later research, however, John Ford did detect some whistling to be a minor component of southern resident killer whale vocalizations, "whereas whistles are the primary social vocalization among the majority of Delphinidae species.")

A separate recording made by UBC scientist H.D. Fisher would, in 1978, have great significance for major orca researcher John Ford. It was the memory of this  recording that enabled Ford to identify that Moby Doll had been a member of J Pod of the Southern Residents. Ford could hear that J Pod had a distinctive animal culture, passing their unique pod-specific dialect from generation to generation. He recently said, "It was a wonderful moment out there in the boat when I recognized the sounds coming from J Pod to be Moby Doll's signature sounds." "The calls Moby Doll made in 1964—we still hear today from his kin group that still exists out there."

The juvenile orca's enormous 6450 g. brain, kept by neurologist Pat McGeer, made a massive impression on scientists. It had a very large cortex and huge auditory nerve that gave evidence of the primary importance of sound to killer whales. The high density of convolutions suggested exceptional intelligence.

Newman and McGeer rightly came to suspect that killer whales do not stop swimming to sleep, because the guards that were posted to Moby Doll's pen never observed it.

Gender confusion
The Vancouver Aquarium's mistaken identification of Moby Doll's gender is notorious, but not improbable. The silt-laden, turbid waters of the Fraser River which flowed through his pen did not allow for the clearest views of his underside. Out of fear, when assistant curator Vince Penfold went diving in Moby Doll's pen, he did it inside a wire cage.

"The whale was originally thought to be male, so was first nicknamed Hound Dog for the docile way it swam" to Vancouver at the end of the harpoon line. Penfold said at the time, "there is so much similarity in the appearance of mature females and immature males it will be impossible to tell until a closer look can be taken at the animal." Alexandra Morton in her research placed juvenile males in a category called "FIM," or "female/immature male." Males only begin to develop their taller dorsal fins from their mid-teens. Aquarium curator Murray Newman was under public pressure, however, to choose a feminine name for the whale supposedly to match his docile behaviour. On July 22, the Vancouver Sun reported that he had selected Moby Doll, in spite of the uncertainty. On July 27, Penfold announced that he had had a close enough look to conclude that Moby was female. The lower-ranked Joe Bauer and a four-year-old visitor had reported seeing Moby Doll's unretracted penis, but neither was listened to.

After Moby's death, when his body had been lifted by a crane, Joe Bauer confidently reached into his genital slit and pulled out his penis, and teasingly asked Penfold, "What do you think now, Vince?" When Sam Burich the sculptor-capturer eventually completed his model of the whale the following year, he made a special casting of the penis as a gift for his onetime assistant Bauer, who had shielded the orca from the bullets during his capture.

Fasting
The juvenile killer whale Moby Doll did not eat for the first two months in captivity. Initially, aquarium staff believed the killer whale would eat salmon and herring, but he didn't eat the salmon that was cautiously let down into the dock on a line, with the idea of keeping the staff safe. The fish that were offered were much smaller than the Southern Residents' normal prey. When tiny one-pound fish were lowered into the water, Moby ignored them and inadvertently knocked them off the lines with his tail as he continued swimming around the pen, oblivious to the fact that they were meant to be food for him. As the staff became increasingly concerned, other foods were sometimes tried in efforts to stimulate the whale's appetite. Some of those, for example, whale meat, could have been suitable if Moby Doll had been a different type of killer whale, such as a local Bigg's (Transient) Killer Whale, but at the time there was no knowledge that there were different killer whale types which ate only specific prey. Aquarium staff thought that all killer whales ate the whole range of killer whale prey. President of the Aquarium Society Ald. Aeneas Bell-Irving called Moby Doll's pen a sick bay and speculated that it might take several months to have him "eating out of hand" and being friendly. At times it was supposed that Moby had eaten a few small fish, but no one actually saw him eating.

Newman and McGeer wrote, "For many weeks a pessimistic outlook prevailed regarding the possibility that the animal would commence to eat. The animal became very noticeably thinner during its fast."

Feeding breakthrough
In early September, assistant curator Vince Penfold reported that the moody and docile killer whale of the first weeks after his capture had become friskier, at times tail slapping and even breaching, although the public was still not permitted to visit the whale until a permanent pen might be built. The feeding breakthrough came on September 9. The Vancouver Sun's headline was simply, "Moby Doll Eats." "It was the first time anyone had seen Moby eat," the report continued.

Ted Griffin's account of the events is of great interest, but diverges from the Vancouver Aquarium's. Griffin, the owner of the Seattle Aquarium, had been trying to capture orcas alive rather than dead. Curious to see the Vancouver Aquarium's captive, he drove his runabout with his wife from Puget Sound to Vancouver. He gained unauthorized access to the army base where Moby Doll's pen was located by tying up at the  Jericho pier. Accustomed to seeing orcas in the wild, "he was disappointed by Moby Doll's gaunt and lethargic appearance." Griffin boldly grabbed a live fish off a string, and slapped it on the water in his hand. He recalled later, "soon Moby Doll was excitedly zooming by looking at the fish which I held in my hand. Finally, the whale came up to the float, stopped, rolled partly on its side, opened its mouth, and yanked the fish away."

This was the first hand-feeding of a killer whale. Something about Griffin's approach had made a connection with the orca. In time, researchers would find that the sharing of food is a key to killer whale society. Had Moby Doll been waiting for a more sociable invitation to eat?

When Murray Newman arrived on the scene, he scolded the intruding Seattle Aquarium director who was his rival - but his staff began imitating Griffin.

The Vancouver Aquarium did not give any detailed explanation for the change in Moby Doll's behavior. The Vancouver Sun account blandly reported that "Moby Doll finally got really hungry," yet killer whales, unlike some other whale species, are not physiologically suited to long fasts, and forage multiple times every day. Newman himself the following day made it evident that the approach to feeding Moby Doll had become more intimate. He was photographed using a far shorter pole than before, to dangle fish at the surface for the whale to take directly, as Moby Doll rolled over, "to show her belly and her 24 pointed teeth two inches long." Even horse meat was reportedly eaten, which suggests that the type of food offered had not been the greatest obstacle. Vince Penfold went even further on the 14th. He told the Vancouver Sun that "he simply held out each of 23 fish as Moby swam by...she opened her mouth and he dropped them in." Moby rejected one type of fish, however. When Penfold held out an orange rock fish, he swam away and slapped the surface of the water. From September 9, "Moby Doll displayed a ravenous appetite, gaining weight steadily."

The feeding problem was solved, but aquarium staff remained intent on searching for a better site with more consistent salinity and tidal cleansing of the water, amid concerns over an unsightly skin condition that Moby Doll had developed.

Feeding routine
Moby Doll's feeding is mainly described in an article written by Murray Newman and Pat McGeer. In their discussion, they stated that, while Orcinus orca was well known as a hunter of marine mammals, "the young specimen captured at Saturna Island preferred fish to mammalian flesh."

After fasting for 54 days, Moby Doll subsequently ate 45-90 kg of fish per day, fed by hand. Vitamins and minerals were added to the fish.

Pacific cod was the main fish given. (In the photo of Murray Newman hand-feeding Moby Doll, this is the fish.)
 Other soft-rayed fishes, such as lingcod and salmon, were also well-received by the young orca. Spiny fishes, such as rockfishes, were often rejected, and he rejected dogfish sharks even after the removal of the spines.

Moby Doll "could usually be summoned by slapping the water with a fish." "The feeder became very confident of the whale's harmlessness, occasionally patting it on the head as it approached for food." The feeder most famously photographed is trainer Terry McLeod. "When a fish was suspended in the water, the whale would often move alongside and examine it with one eye. This required a certain adjustment of the head which was done with great effort because of the considerable momentum of the large body and the limited flexure of the head." "It always took the food in a slow and deliberate manner." "The whale used its teeth merely for grasping the fish and never for chewing. In most cases, it would swallow the fish immediately, head first." When he wanted more food, Moby Doll frequently engaged in "lob-tailing and flipper-slapping...These behavior patterns seemed to indicate annoyance."

Moby Doll's surface activity increased after he started eating. "Some playfulness was observed. Many fish had been released in the pen and one day, about a week after the whale began feeding, it was seen chasing a 7 kg. lingcod at the surface. The whale would seize the fish and toss it a meter or more, then chase it, seize and toss it again. This continued for about 10 minutes before the fish was eaten."

Death
"On October 8, Moby seemed vigorous, eating a hundred pounds of fish, but the next day something was wrong. At her 2:00 p.m. feeding, the whale took only a single herring."

Aquarium staff were called to the pen. Pat McGeer recalled, "Moby was having trouble surfacing to blow and breathe. His last breath came when he was still beneath the surface and the whale probably took in water instead of air. Then," said McGeer, "he just sank to the bottom and drowned." Joe Bauer "found army divers reluctant to enter the pen," because they were "petrified" of the killer whale. "When they finally raised the lifeless body at 5:15 p.m., the aquarium staff was devastated."

McGeer said, "It was like a death in the family." Curator Murray Newman said, "Moby was the most fascinating of all captive animals. I loved that whale. I think that capturing it was the best thing I ever did."

Necropsy

"Scientists who went to work on the dead whale included medical doctors, a dermatologist, a pathologist, a biologist, and University of B.C. neurochemist Dr Pat McGeer." They worked until midnight. However, the inconclusive necropsy took place in an era when little was known about killer whales. Ideas vary about what caused Moby Doll's weakness and drowning, and multiple possible contributing factors can be given differing emphases.

The skin condition that marred Moby Doll's appearance drew a lot of attention, but opinions were divided about its seriousness. The "dermatologist said the fungus condition was superficial and could not cause death." Its cause was attributed to the low salinity of the Fraser River delta at Jericho, where Moby Doll's pen was located.

The necropsy uncovered other health problems that would have weakened Moby. On the surface, "the harpoon wound had healed well," but internally "Moby had suffered a minor skull fracture and some brain damage from the harpoon and was the victim of a massive infestation of worms. McGeer said neither should have been fatal by itself." The worms that infested the stomachs of Moby Doll were tentatively identified as a nematode parasite of the Pacific cod that was fed to him. Infections were present in the lungs, kidneys, and lymph nodes in the neck. Although Moby Doll had been eating for a month, his body condition was still assessed as "emaciated." "The outline of the ribs was clearly visible in the thoracic region." His blubber was assessed as thin, too. His weight at death was 1040 kg.

Writing later, Newman and McGeer summarized: "The enervating effects of acute mycotic and bacterial infections together with the debilitated condition of the animal probably led to exhaustion and drowning in the water of low salinity."

McGeer said, "On the day of Moby's death the salinity at Jericho was 12 parts per thousand, compared to a normal seawater level of about 35 parts per thousand." The extra effort of swimming 24/7 with less than accustomed buoyancy might have been the final straw. Moby Doll's trainer Terry McLeod reaffirmed this view in 2015. In the end, McGeer laid the blame on a lack of funding from the community to create new facilities for the public aquarium.

In the spirit of dissection dominating biology in that era, scientists coveted Moby's body parts; most fatefully, Pat McGeer kept his brain, which became a pivotal part of the orca's legacy through Greenpeace.

Legacy

At the Vancouver Aquarium
Although not on display except for one day, Moby Doll generated widespread publicity, and attendances doubled. After this initiation into capturing orcas, aquarium officials were eager for more. In their scientific paper, Newman and McGeer's final words about Moby Doll were, "The experience indicated the feasibility of maintaining and possibly training killer whales in captivity." Sam Burich's sculpture, completed the following year, was placed in a foyer leading to a tank that would house subsequent captive killer whales, and was visible to them.

Skana aka Walter

As it happened, the Vancouver Aquarium did not have another killer whale until March 1967, when it opportunistically acquired Walter, another Southern Resident Killer Whale. "Walter the Whale" had been rented from the Seattle Public Aquarium by Bob O'Loughlin to appear at the Vancouver Boat Show. The killer whale had been starring, helping the Boat Show "to an attendance record of more than 100,000." The Vancouver Aquarium did not want to let the rented star killer whale leave the city, and bought Walter.

Feeding
The aquarium's assistant curator Vince Penfold donned a scuba suit and welcomed the killer whale with lunch underwater, captured in the Vancouver Sun in one of the great early killer whale photographs. The aquarium staff had learnt a great deal from their time with Moby Doll; with the more knowledgeable practices they implemented with Walter, the aquarium would be repaid with interest by this killer whale's extraordinary stardom. The whale was fed "100 pounds of fish, mostly ling cod and herring, in four daily feedings," illustrated in an intimate photograph with Terry McLeod, who had also been Moby Doll's trainer.

Gender confusion
Weighing approximately 3,000 pounds and "just under 15 feet" long, this was still an immature orca, whose dorsal fin could not indicate gender. In Walter's new tank at the Vancouver Aquarium, Vince Penfold reversed the gender problem he had had with Moby Doll, whose 'feminine' name had been given to a male killer whale. This time a 'masculine' name had been given to a female whale prior to the Vancouver Aquarium's involvement. The assistant curator said, "With the clear water it was easy for a biologist to make the distinction." This quickly prompted hopes for a pregnancy. The name Walter was not considered fitting, and after a contest with over 5,000 entries, the aquarium selected for her the name Skana.

Immediate stardom
"Skana brought heady times to Vancouver. From the moment she took her first turn in the pool, the young whale was the aquarium’s prime attraction and an invaluable asset to the city’s growing tourist industry. That first spring, Stanley Park saw traffic like it never had before, with tourists and locals alike packing the aquarium. Then came the summer crush. In August alone, 119,746 people visited, bringing the year’s total to 527,536—an 80 percent increase over the same period in 1966."

Public perceptions
In these waters at that time, killer whales' generic experience of humans would be to get shot by fishermen, who considered them vermin.

Moby Doll was popular locally and abroad. According to the obituary in The Times of London, "the widespread publicity – some of it the first positive press ever about killer whales – marked the beginning of an important change in the public attitude toward the species."

"Moby Doll's time in Vancouver was brief, but he had made his mark...His unplanned capture proved the viability of holding a killer whale in captivity, and it hinted at the potential of live orcas as tourist attractions. It also revealed the emotional attachment the species could generate."

Whales for sale
A pivotal aspect of Moby Doll's captivity was manifested in the immediate offers to buy him. They came from Charlie White of the Undersea Gardens at Oak Bay Marina on Vancouver Island, and from Marineland of the Pacific in California, which had captured Wanda, the diseased first killer whale ever held in captivity. White's ambition was to have a killer whale performing for tourists. Dr. Newman rejected the offers of $20,000 for the killer whale, which were splashed in the newspapers, claiming the whale would be worth a million, and that aquarium officials were interested in the scientific, not commercial, value of the whale. Nonetheless, the public discovered that the 'vermin', when captured alive, had a dollar value, a large one. Vancouver's mayor, William Rathie, disagreed with Newman, saying he was all for selling it and for maintaining "a permanent whale-hunting expedition" to catch killer whales for profit.

The next killer whale capture, Namu's, was unintended like Moby Doll's. But when the killer whale was trapped by a fishing net near the town of Namu, British Columbia, one of the fishermen, Robert "Lonnie" McGarvey, remembering Newman's valuation of Moby Doll, believed the 'blackfish' would make him some money, and started looking for a customer, and found one. Thus Moby Doll's captivity sparked the beginning of the commerce in live captive killer whales as a kind of marine circus animal.

Trainers
Terry McLeod was a young diver who worked as a collector for the Vancouver Aquarium and cared for many of its animals. When just nineteen years old, he became Moby Doll's trainer, and "was the person who spent the most time with the orca at the Jericho Army Base." He appears in some photographs hand-feeding him.

Subsequently, aquarium director Murray Newman "sent the young man to Sea Life Park on Oahu to apprentice in marine mammal training." He then became the chief trainer at the Vancouver Aquarium, focusing on two dolphins, before becoming Skana's trainer. With his assistant Mark Perry, he performed daily in the water with this orca.

When seventeen, Perry had been one of those who sneaked onto the army base to see Moby Doll. He was familiar with the fishermen's hatred of killer whales. Moby Doll's explosive breath scared him, and the orca's tall dorsal fin mesmerized him, but he "couldn't believe how placid it was."

That encounter shaped his future career. In 1967, he took a job as a floor boy at the Vancouver Aquarium, when Skana was captive. Soon he was assisting Terry McLeod in shows. He quickly developed doubts about orca captivity, like his colleague Paul Spong, but did not want to give up working with the orca. In 1968, when the Vancouver Aquarium acquired more captive orcas and opened the Garden Bay Whale Station, Perry "was the natural choice" to run it. Later, he was hired by Sealand of the Pacific to work with a captive orca named Haida.

The brain and Greenpeace
After the necropsy, Pat McGeer kept Moby Doll's brain at his UBC neurological lab.

In early 1967, McGeer created a position there that included a contract for research on cetaceans at the Vancouver Aquarium. The position went to Paul Spong, a postdoctoral researcher in physiological psychology at UCLA. Spong studied the aquarium's orcas but began to question their captivity. In early 1969, McGeer gave Spong Moby Doll's brain. "The young scientist was dumbfounded. Not only was the organ much larger than a human brain, but it presented a higher density of convolutions - a feature often used to distinguish human intelligence. Moreover, the neocortex was immense, particularly the portion devoted to the processing of sound. For the first time, Spong grasped the fundamentally acoustic nature of killer whales and in the process realized what a limited view of them his visual acuity tests had provided. Indeed, for a scientist attuned to cerebral structure, the brain of Moby Doll was an epiphany. What secrets did this large and complex organ hold? What sort of creature was Orcinus orca?"

On June 3, Spong gave a presentation at the UBC campus, during which he concluded that the Vancouver Aquarium should put its captive killer whales "back into the ocean." The following day, aquarium director Murray Newman ended Spong's contract.

A few years later, Farley Mowat visited Vancouver to promote his book A Whale for the Killing  (1972). Spong talked to him for hours, and "Mowat drew Spong's attention to commercial whaling," leading him to become an anti-whaling activist. He joined with Robert Hunter in the Stop Ahab Committee, which became the dominant faction of the old Greenpeace organization.

Just before Greenpeace's first big anti-whaling event, Spong had Moby Doll's brain photographed next to a human brain, to demonstrate how large it was, in order to persuade people that whales deserved to be protected. When launching their first expedition, in April 1975, the activists "unfurled a flag featuring an indigenous image of a killer whale as they departed," with poetic justice, from Jericho Beach. And it came to pass that great whales all around the world partly owed their survival to the posthumous influence of the harpooned juvenile orca from J Pod of the Southern Residents, who had swum in circles in a seapen at Jericho Beach.

See also
 List of individual cetaceans

References

General references

External links
"A listing of dolphin/whale captures..." at pbs.org

"160 Captives - Moby Doll" at tumblr.com

Individual orcas
Southern resident orcas